The Tell Tamer bombings occurred on 11 December 2015 after three truck bombs killed 60 people and injured more than 80 in the Rojava controlled town of Tell Tamer in Syria's northeastern Al-Hasakah Governorate. The blasts struck near a Kurdish militia forces field hospital and in the crowded Souk Al Jumla market square, where the majority of the fatalities occurred.

References

2015 in Syria
Explosions in 2015
ISIL terrorist incidents in Syria
Massacres of the Syrian civil war perpetrated by ISIL
Mass murder in 2015